Robecco Pavese is a comune (municipality) in the Province of Pavia in the Italian region Lombardy, located in the Oltrepò Pavese about 45 km south of Milan and about 15 km south of Pavia.

References

Cities and towns in Lombardy